Gypsonoma sociana is a moth of the family Tortricidae. It is found from Europe to Russia, China (Henan, Gansu) and Japan.

The wingspan is 12–15 mm. Adults are on wing from July to August.

The larvae burrows into a twig of a Populus or Salix species (including Salix sachalinensis and Salix raddeana) and later occupies a leaf bud.

References

External links
UKmoths

Moths described in 1811
Eucosmini
Moths of Japan
Moths of Europe